Emil Žnidar (born 27 February 1914, date of death unknown) was a Slovenian alpine skier. He competed in the men's combined event at the 1936 Winter Olympics, representing Yugoslavia.

References

1914 births
Year of death missing
Slovenian male alpine skiers
Olympic alpine skiers of Yugoslavia
Alpine skiers at the 1936 Winter Olympics
People from the Municipality of Jesenice